Ixelles Cemetery, located in Ixelles in the southern part of Brussels, is one of the major cemeteries in Belgium. Ixelles Cemetery also refers to a neighbourhood with a lot of bars and restaurants for students, north of the actual cemetery. It is in fact located between the two main campuses (Solbosch and La Plaine) of the Université libre de Bruxelles (ULB).

Notable interments

Personalities buried there include:
 Luigi Bigiarelli (1876–1908), athlete, founder of the S.S. Lazio
 Anna Boch (1848–1936), painter
 Jules Bordet (1870–1961), Nobel Prize in medicine
 Georges Boulanger (1837–1891), French Minister of War and exile in Belgium, who committed suicide there
 Victor Bourgeois (1897–1962), architect and urban planner
 Marcel Broodthaers (1924–1976), artist
 Fernand Brouez (1861–1900), editor of La Société Nouvelle
 Charles De Coster (1827–1879), novelist
 Neel Doff (1858–1942), artists' model and writer
 Jean Isaac Effront (1856–1931), inventor
 Antonio Oladeinde Fernandez (1936–2015), Nigerian diplomat and business tycoon
 Édouard Louis Geerts (1846–1889), sculptor, whose tomb was designed by the architect Victor Horta and the sculptor Charles van der Stappen
 Lucette Heuseux (1913–2010), painter
 Victor Horta (1861–1947), architect
 Louis Hymans (1829–1884), journalist and politician
 Paul Hymans (1865–1941), statesman
 Joseph Jacquet (1857–1917), army general during World War I
 Sylvain de Jong (1868–1928, maker of the luxury Minerva automobile
 Frédéric de La Hault (1860–1903), developed an 1885 motorised tricycle
 Camille Lemonnier (1844–1913), writer
 Constantin Meunier (1831–1905), painter and sculptor
 Jean-Baptiste Moëns (1833–1908), philatelist
 Frederic Neuhaus (1846–1912), pharmacist, inventor of chocolate pralines
 Paul Saintenoy (1862–1952), architect
 Jacques Saintenoy (1845–1947), architect
 Ernest Solvay (1838–1922), chemist and industrialist, tomb designed by Victor Horta
 Carl Sternheim (1878–1942), German writer
 Marc Van Bever (1974–2010), film producer
 Joseph Wieniawski (1837–1912), composer
 Antoine Wiertz (1806–1865), painter
 Eugène Ysaÿe (1858–1931), violinist

War graves

In the Field of Honour in Block A are buried First World War soldiers from Belgium, France, Italy, Russia and Great Britain (twelve identified soldiers), who died mainly as prisoners of war.

See also

 List of cemeteries in Belgium
 Brussels Cemetery
 Laeken Cemetery
 Molenbeek-Saint-Jean Cemetery
 Saint-Josse-ten-Noode Cemetery
 Schaerbeek Cemetery

References

Notes

External links

 

Cemeteries in Belgium
Buildings and structures in Brussels
Tourist attractions in Brussels
Geography of Brussels
Culture in Brussels
Ixelles
Commonwealth War Graves Commission cemeteries in Belgium